Tweedie is a surname of Scottish origin. The name is a habitational name from Tweedie, located in the parish of Stonehouse, south of Glasgow. The origin and meaning of the name is unknown. Notable people with the surname include:

Alexander Tweedie (1794–1884), Scottish physician and writer
Andrew Tweedie (born 1975), South African cricketer
Charles Tweedie (1868-1925), Scottish mathematician
Dave Tweedie (born 1968), American composer, multi-instrumentalist and record producer
David Tweedie (accountant) (born 1944), Scottish accountant
David Tweedie (mathematician) (1865-1934), Scottish mathematician
David J. Tweedie (1870-1926), Scottish mathematician
Ethel Brilliana Tweedie (1862–1940), British author and feminist
Frederick Tweedie (1877–after 1925), Canadian politician
George R. Tweedie (1857–after 1893), English businessman
Herbert J. Tweedie (1864–1906), English golf course architect
Hugh Tweedie, English officer in the Royal Navy
Irina Tweedie (1907–1999), Russian-British Sufi
Jill Tweedie (1936–1993), British feminist, writer and broadcaster
Lemuel John Tweedie (1849–1917), Canadian politician and father of Frederick Tweedie
Mark Tweedie (born 1956), American politician
Maurice Tweedie, British medical physicist and statistician
Merylyn Tweedie (born 1953), multi-media artist from New Zealand
Michael Tweedie (1907–1993), naturalist and archaeologist
Penny Tweedie (1940–2011), English photojournalist
Richard Tweedie (1947–2001), Australian statistician
Rob Tweedie (born 1979), American musician
Scott Tweedie (born 1988), Australian television and radio presenter
Stephen Tweedie (born 1969), Scottish software developer
Thomas Tweedie (1871–1944), Canadian politician and Chief Justice
William Tweedie (1836-1914), Scottish Major-General and Diplomat
William King Tweedie (1803–1863), Scottish Presbyterian minister
William Menzies Tweedie (1826–1878), Scottish portrait painter
Findlay George Tweedie (born 2010), Scottish schoolboy and artist

See also
Clan Tweedie, a Scottish clan, or historical family in Scotland
Tweedie, Alberta
Tweedie distribution, any of a certain parameterized family of probability distributions
Tweedy (disambiguation), a variant of name Tweedie

References

Surnames of Lowland Scottish origin